Marmoretta is an extinct genus of small lepidosauromorph reptile known from the Middle Jurassic (late Bathonian age) of Oxfordshire, England and Skye, Scotland. It contains a single species, Marmoretta oxoniensis.

Etymology
Marmoretta was first described and named by Susan E. Evans in 1991 and the type species is Marmoretta oxoniensis. The generic name is derived from Latin marmoros, meaning "Marble" and refers to the Forest Marble Formation - the source of the initial specimens of Marmoretta. The specific name is derived from Oxonia, the Latinised form of "Oxford", in reference to Oxfordshire.

Discovery
Marmoretta is known from holotype BMNH R.12020, the anterior region of a right maxilla. Many specimens are referred to the species from the type locality, and together represent a nearly complete skull. All specimens are housed in the Natural History Museum. They were collected from the Mammal Bed of the Forest Marble Formation, at Kirtlington, Oxfordshire, which has yielded a rich assemblage of small vertebrates including mammals, frogs, salamanders and other small reptiles. Marmoretta is very common in that locality but its remains are fragmentary. In 1994, additional specimens of Marmoretta were described from the Kilmaluag Formation (previously known as the Ostracod Limestones) of the Great Estuarine Group in Skye. This material of Marmoretta includes the first associated skull and postcranial remains. They confirm the original description and reconstruction, and provide additional support for position of Marmoretta as the sister taxon of Lepidosauria. Both localities dates to the Late Bathonian stage of the Middle Jurassic period, about 166.2-164.7 million years ago. In 2021, the Skye material was redescribed with CT scanning, and was found to slightly differ from the specimens from Oxford, with a different arrangement of palatal teeth and a differently shaped parabasisphenoid.

Phylogeny
Susan E. Evans and Magdalena Borsuk−Białynicka (2009) performed a phylogenetic analysis that recovered Sophineta as the sister group of Lepidosauria. The inclusion of Sophineta displaced the relictual Middle Jurassic Marmoretta and gave the origin of Lepidosauria much older age. The cladogram below follows their results. Some subsequent phylogenies have recovered Marmoretta as a stem-squamate, closer to squamates than rhynchocephalians. In the 2021 redescription, it was found to be a basal lepidosauromorph, most closely related to Fraxinisaura from the Middle Triassic of Germany.

References

Jurassic lepidosauromorphs
Fossil taxa described in 1991
Extinct animals of Europe
Prehistoric reptile genera
Taxa named by Susan E. Evans